"Lies" is a 1987 song by South African artist Jonathan Butler.  It was issued as the first single from his second studio album.

"Lies" became a hit in the U.S. (#27), the UK (#18), and Ireland (#16).  It was a bigger Adult Contemporary hit, peaking at #16 in the U.S. and spending two weeks at #11 on the Canadian Adult Contemporary chart.

Chart history

References

External links
 

1987 songs
1987 singles